Rémi Sergio (born 1 December 1987) is a French professional footballer who plays for Villefranche.

Career
Sergio played for Nîmes Olympique in Ligue 2 and for Belgian Jupiler League side R. Charleroi S.C.

References

External links

1987 births
Living people
Association football midfielders
French footballers
Olympique de Marseille players
R. Charleroi S.C. players
ES Troyes AC players
FC Aurillac Arpajon Cantal Auvergne players
Nîmes Olympique players
FC Villefranche Beaujolais players
Ligue 2 players
Championnat National players
Championnat National 2 players
Championnat National 3 players
French expatriate footballers
Expatriate footballers in Belgium
French expatriate sportspeople in Belgium
Footballers from Marseille